Deltoplastis lobigera is a moth in the family Lecithoceridae. It is found in Taiwan, the provinces of Zhejiang, Hubei and Sichuan in China, and in Vietnam. Its type locality is Tianmushan in Zhejiang.

Description
The wingspan is 12.5–15 mm.

References

Deltoplastis
Moths of Asia
Moths of Taiwan
Moths described in 1978